No One Gets Out is a 1991 studio album by Detroit metal band Halloween, recorded at R.T. Audio in Novi, Michigan with studio owner/engineer Rob Tylak.

History 
No One Gets Out is Halloween's second release and is perhaps their most well known for the song "Kings" which was played at the 1990 Detroit Pistons playoff game. The album is a quantum leap from Don't Metal with Evil album. It's much more heavy and speedy than its predecessor, interrupted by the occasional half-ballad.

In 1989, new members Billy Gray and future Godsmack drummer Tommy Stewart joined Halloween. At the time, the band was under the same management as Florida Metal band Crimson Glory and Halloween began production on a new album for Warren Wyatt management. In 1990, Stewart and Gray departed and enter three new members, guitarist Donny Allen, guitarist Tim Wright and drummer Billy Adams (a.k.a. BA!). Recorded in 1990, two new demo tapes surfaced, one with an orange sleeve with an illustration and one that has a white covered sleeve with a photo of the band. The orange is rarer than the white. The orange contained a demo version of the track "The Thing That Creeps", while the white sleeve copy did not. The white sleeve copy also had a different track order. All demo tracks were later released on the studio album.

The album contains three cover songs. The first is "Crawl to the Altar" which guitarist Tim Wright brought to the band from his former group "Erebus". The second is a cover of a "Seduce" song aptly titled "Halloween". The last is a cover of a Kiss song Detroit Rock City.

Special guest Steve Langley (of the band EZ Access) played 12 string guitar on the album.
Billy Gray played the 2nd guitar solo on “Kings”, at the end of the song.

Tracks
All songs written by Halloween except where noted.

The album was reissued by Molten Metal U.S.A in 2001. It contained additional five bonus tracks from Vicious Demos (1990).

Personnel
Brian Thomas – vocals
George Neal – bass
Donny Allen – guitar
Tim Wright – guitar, acoustic guitar
Billy Adams (a.k.a. BA!) – drums

Additional musicians
Billy Gray – 2nd guitar solo on "Kings"
Steve Langley – acoustic guitar
Melanie Adams – voices on "Sanity In Danger"

References

External links
 Official Halloween website

Halloween (band) albums
1991 albums